Mount Watson is a  mountain summit located in Mount Assiniboine Provincial Park, in the Canadian Rockies of British Columbia, Canada. Its nearest higher peak is The Marshall,  to the southeast.

History
The mountain was named in 1924 after Sir David Watson (1871-1922), commander of the 4th Canadian Division during World War II. The mountain's name was officially adopted on March 31, 1924 when approved by the Geographical Names Board of Canada.

Geology
Mount Watson is composed of sedimentary rock laid down during the Cambrian period. Formed in shallow seas, this sedimentary rock was pushed east and over the top of younger rock during the Laramide orogeny.

Climate
Based on the Köppen climate classification, Mount Watson is located in a subarctic climate zone with cold, snowy winters, and mild summers. Temperatures can drop below −20 °C with wind chill factors below −30 °C. Precipitation runoff from Mount Watson drains into tributaries of the Mitchell River.

See also
 Geography of British Columbia
 Geology of British Columbia

References

External links
Mount Assiniboine Provincial Park

Two-thousanders of British Columbia
Canadian Rockies
Kootenay Land District